2M or 2-M may refer to:

 2m, or two metres
 2 million
 Amateur radio 2-meter band
 2M (alliance), a container shipping industry alliance between Maersk Line and MSC
 2M (DOS), a DOS program that formats extra high capacity floppy disks
 2M TV, a Moroccan state-owned TV station
 Moldavian Airlines, IATA airline designator 2M
 a prefix used by the Two Micron All-Sky Survey (2MASS)

See also

 
 
 M2 (disambiguation)
 MM (disambiguation)